Edin's Hall Broch (also Edinshall Broch; Odin's Hall Broch) is a 2nd-century broch near Duns in the Borders of Scotland. It is one of very few brochs found in southern Scotland. It is roughly 28 metres in diameter.

Name
In the late 18th century this site was called "Woden's Hall or Castle" (Woden the chief god from Anglo-Saxon mythology). Its later name change apparently recalls the legend of the three-headed giant The Red Ettin known in tales and ballads.

Location
Edin's Hall Broch is one of the most southerly broch survivals, which are more typically associated with Northern Scotland. It is 4 miles north of the town of Duns. It stands on the northeast slope of Cockburn Law just above a fairly steep slope down to the Whiteadder Water.

The broch stands in the northwest corner an Iron Age hillfort which presumably pre-dates the broch. The hillfort consists of a double rampart and ditches, enclosing an oval area some 135 metres by 75 metres. The entrance was on the west side. A large circular structure (roundhouse) in the centre of the fort, close to the broch, may have been the most important building before the broch's construction.

Dating
It is assumed that the hillfort dates to the pre-Roman Iron Age. The date of the broch is uncertain but it has been speculated that it was built between the two main periods of Roman occupation in Scotland: some time in the 2nd century AD. Excavations at Torwoodlee Broch, also in the Scottish Borders, has shown that it was built and demolished during this period.

Within the hillfort is an array of stone footings marking the positions of houses and other structures. Some of the houses overlie the defences – indicating that they are later than hillfort and may be later than the broch as well.

Description

The broch has an external diameter of 28 metres, and an internal diameter of 17 metres. This is unusually large compared with a typical Highland broch and suggests that it may not have been as tall as the northern brochs. The walls of the broch survive to a height of between 1.0 and 1.8 metres. The entrance passage is on the east side and has two guard chambers flanking the doorway. The interior of the broch has three intramural cells which are all approximately dumb-bell shaped. The cell on the south side has the remains of a stone stairway at its north end which presumably rose to the wallhead.

The broch lies within a rectangular enclosure measuring about 58 by 54 metres.

Excavations
Edin's Hall was "cleared" by antiquarians in the 19th century. The relics recovered were donated to the National Museum of Scotland. These included a stone spindle whorl, a piece of a jet ring, an amber bead, bones, an oyster shell, and a fragment of a glass bracelet.

Two copper ingots, one of which is now in the National Museum, were apparently found with a metal detector inside the broch in 1976. The ingots were derived from local copper mines and may have been an important source of wealth for the inhabitants.

An archaeological survey and sample excavation was conducted in 1996. A few artefacts including coarse pottery and a stone spindle whorl were recovered.

References

External links

Berwickshire
Hill forts in Scotland
Brochs
2nd century in Scotland
Archaeological sites in the Scottish Borders
Scheduled monuments in Scotland
Historic Scotland properties in the Scottish Borders